Raulinoreitzia is a genus of South American plants in the tribe Eupatorieae within the family Asteraceae.

 Species
 Raulinoreitzia crenulata (Spreng.) R.M.King & H.Rob. - Brazil, Bolivia, Argentina, Peru, Paraguay
 Raulinoreitzia leptophlebia (B.L.Rob.) R.M.King & H.Rob. - Rio Grande do Sul
 Raulinoreitzia tremula (Hook. & Arn.) R.M.King & H.Rob. - Brazil, Bolivia, Argentina

References

Asteraceae genera
Flora of South America
Eupatorieae